Edward Waldo Forbes (1873-1969) was an American art historian. He was the Director of the Fogg Art Museum at Harvard University from 1909 to 1944.

Early life
Edward Waldo Forbes, of the Forbes family, was born on July 16, 1873, on Naushon Island off Cape Cod in Massachusetts. His father, William Hathaway Forbes, was a co-founder of the Bell Telephone Company with Alexander Graham Bell. His mother, Edith Emerson Forbes, was the daughter of poet Ralph Waldo Emerson. His paternal grandfather, John Murray Forbes, was a French-born railroad magnate, merchant, and abolitionist. His brother, William Cameron Forbes, went on to serve as the United States Ambassador to Japan from 1930 to 1932.

Forbes was educated at the Milton Academy, a boarding school in Milton, Massachusetts. He graduated from Harvard University in 1895. While he was at Harvard, he attended art history lectures by Charles Eliot Norton. Forbes traveled to Europe in 1908, where he studied Italian paintings. He attended the University of Oxford, studying English Literature from 1900 to 1902.

Career
Forbes co-founded the Harvard River Associates in 1902 with Robert Bacon, James Abercrombie Burden, Jr., Augustus Hemenway and Thomas Nelson Perkins. The real estate venture consisted in acquiring land between the Harvard Yard and the Charles River for US$400,000 to preserve the beauty of the area near the Harvard campus remained "collegiate". Subsequently, the land became part of the campus in its expansion.

Forbes taught at his alma mater, Middlesex School, from 1904 to 1905. By 1907, he conducted a course on Florentine painting at his other alma mater, Harvard University. He became a lecturer in Fine Arts at Harvard in 1909. By 1935, he was promoted as the Martin A. Ryerson Professor in the Fine Arts at Harvard University. He retired in 1944.

Forbes served as the Director of the Fogg Art Museum at Harvard University from 1909 to 1944. Under his leadership, the art collection was vastly expanded, and a new building was constructed in 1927. He led many fundraising campaigns with Paul J. Sachs. He founded the Center for Conservation and Technical Studies, later renamed the Straus Center for Conservation and Technical Studies. He promoted the X-ray study of the paintings in the museum collection. He urged art conservator George L. Stout to work with chemist Rutherford John Gettens, both of whom pioneered scientific art preservation. Moreover, he sailed aboard the Asama Maru from San Francisco, California, to Japan to undertake an art research trip in 1931. He retired in 1944.

Forbes served as the President of the American Research Center in Egypt from 1948 to 1962.

As a permanent tribute, the plaza outside and the arcade inside Harvard's Holyoke Center were named in his honour. The occasion was marked by a ceremony on 17 October 1966.

Forbes Prize Lecture
In 1958 a Forbes Prize Fund had been set up at the Fogg Art Museum (now part of Harvard Art Museums), Harvard University, to which financial contributions were made in recognition of Edward W. Forbes's services to conservation. The fund was to be administered by the International Institute for Conservation to provide some kind of prize for outstanding work in the field of conservation. It was agreed in 1960 that the accumulated funds should be awarded in the form of a fee for a Forbes Lecture at the Rome Conference, and that Harold Plenderleith would be a suitable recipient. A Forbes Lecture has been given at each subsequent IIC Congress

Forbes Pigment Collection
The Forbes’ Pigment Collection contains over 3000 colorants assembled by Edward Waldo Forbes. Currently, the core collection of pigments is housed in the Straus Center for Conservation and Technical Studies, Harvard Art Museums, while Forbes’ private collection of pigments resides at the New York University Institute of Fine Arts Conservation Center.

Philanthropy
Forbes served in the American Red Cross during World War I.

Forbes served on the board of trustees of the Boston Museum of Fine Arts from 1903 to 1963. He also served on the board of trustees of the Wadsworth Athenaeum in Hartford, Connecticut. He served on the administrative committee of the Dumbarton Oaks Collection and Research Library of Byzantine Studies in Washington, D.C., from 1941 to 1963. Additionally, he served on the Board of Trustees of Public Reservations of Massachusetts for six decades. He became honorary fellow of the International Institute for Conservation in 1958, where the annual Edward W. Forbes Prize was named in his honor.

Forbes was a recipient of an honorary A.M. from Harvard in 1921, an honorary LL.D. from the University of Pittsburgh in 1927, and an honorary Doctorate of Arts from Harvard in 1942. He was the recipient of the knighthood of the Legion of Honor from the Republic of France in 1937.

Personal life
Forbes married Margaret Laighton in 1907. They had five children, including John Murray Forbes, Mary Emerson Forbes, Elliott Forbes, Anne Forbes, and Rosamond (Mrs. Carl Pickhardt). They resided at Gerry's Landing in Cambridge, Massachusetts. His wife predeceased him in 1966.

Forbes was an amateur painter and sailor.

Death
Forbes died on March 11, 1969, at the McLean Hospital in Belmont, a suburb of Boston in Massachusetts. He was ninety-five years old.

Further reading
Agnes Mongan, John Coolidge, José Luis Sert, George Leslie Stout, Elizabeth H. Jones. Edward Waldo Forbes: Yankee Visionary. (Cambridge, Mass.: Fogg Art Museum, Harvard University, 1971).

References

1873 births
1969 deaths
People from Dukes County, Massachusetts
People from Cambridge, Massachusetts
Harvard University alumni
Harvard University faculty
American art historians
Chevaliers of the Légion d'honneur
Edward W.
Milton Academy alumni
Historians from Massachusetts
McLean Hospital patients
Middlesex School alumni